The Tom Richards Cup, also known as the Tom Richards Trophy, is an international rugby union trophy awarded to the winner of British & Irish Lions vs. Australia test series. It was commissioned for the 2001 British & Irish Lions tour series and the inaugural winner was Australia, who won the series 2–1. This was the first time that Australia had managed to defeat the Lions in a series. Twelve years later, the Lions won the 2013 tour to Australia 1–2, making them the current holders of the trophy. The two teams' first meeting was in Australia in 1899 where they played a four test series, won by the Lions 3–1.

Tom Richards is the only Australian-born player to have represented both the Wallabies and Lions. However, Blair Swannell, born in England, also represented the Lions (1899 & 1904) and Australia (1905). Richards took part in the Gallipoli campaign and for his efforts in France was awarded the Military Cross. In 1908 Richards played in the first Wallaby team to tour Britain and won the gold medal at the 1908 Olympic Games. In 1910 he represented the Lions as a replacement on their tour to South Africa whilst living in the country. In 1912 he was selected for the Wallaby tour to the United States and Canada.

As per convention, the next Lions tour to Australia is scheduled for 2025 following the tours of New Zealand (2017) and South Africa (2021).

Results

See also

History of rugby union matches between Australia and the British & Irish Lions

References
 

History of rugby union matches between Australia and the British & Irish Lions
Rugby union international rivalry trophies
2001 establishments in Australia
International rugby union competitions hosted by Australia